Plural voting is the practice whereby one person might be able to vote multiple times in an election. It is not to be confused with a plurality voting system which does not necessarily involve plural voting. Weighted voting is a generalisation of plural voting.

United Kingdom
In the United Kingdom, up to 1948, people affiliated with a university were allowed a vote in both a university constituency and their home constituency, and property owners could vote both in the constituency where their property lay and that in which they lived, if the two were different. In 1892 George Shaw-Lefevre MP stated:

The Representation of the People Act 1918, Section 8(1), provided that "a man shall not vote at a general election ... for more than one constituency for which he is registered by virtue of other qualifications [than a residence qualification] of whatever kind, and a woman shall not vote at a general election ... for more than one constituency for which she is registered by virtue of any other qualification [than a local government qualification]." As a result, no-one could vote more than twice at a general election. After 1910, the Liberal government was intent on passing a Plural Voting Bill that sought to prevent electors who appeared on the electoral register more than once from voting more than once. Liberal and Unionist headquarters were in agreement that 29 seats were won by Unionists in December 1910 because of plural voting. However, before the bill could pass through Parliament, the Great War started and the bill was shelved. These practices were finally abolished for parliamentary elections by the Representation of the People Act 1948, which first applied in the 1950 General Election. However, plural voting for local government elections continued until it was abolished, outside the City of London, by the Representation of the People Act 1969. It still exists in the City of London.

Northern Ireland
Until the Electoral Law Act 1968 took effect in 1969, the Queen's University, Belfast constituency was retained in the Parliament of Northern Ireland and owners of businesses were allowed to cast more than one vote in parliamentary elections.  Tim Pat Coogan wrote on this subject:
Limited companies and occupiers of premises with a rateable valuation of £10 could appoint nominees—as could companies for each £10 of their valuations—under a system of plural voting, which even allowed such votes to be cast in another constituency ...
Plural voting also existed in local government elections in Northern Ireland, as in the rest of the United Kingdom (see above).

Belgium
In Belgium, voting was restricted to the wealthy tax brackets from independence in 1830 until 1848, when it was expanded to include a somewhat larger number of voters. The restriction on voting was abolished in 1893 and replaced with plural voting. This was applied for elections from 1894 to 1919 as a way to limit the impact of universal suffrage.

Every male citizen over 25 got one vote for legislative elections, but some electors got up to two supplementary votes according to some criteria:
holder of a school diploma;
family head over 30, paying a poll tax of at least five francs;
holder of a savings account of at least 2,000 francs, or beneficiary of a life annuity of at least 100 francs.

For municipal elections, a fourth vote was granted to family heads who paid a fixed level of electoral tax, or whose cadastral income was at least of 150 francs.

Ireland 
Plural voting for Dáil elections was abolished by the Electoral Act 1923: electors could be registered in only one constituency: the constituency in which he or she was ordinarily resident; the constituency in which he or she occupied business premises; or one of two university constituencies. University constituencies were abolished at the 1937 general election. University constituencies were recreated in 1938 for the Seanad Éireann, the upper house of the Oireachtas (the Irish legislature). Graduates of Dublin University and the National University are entitled to vote in these constituencies in addition to exercising their normal vote for Dáil Éireann, the lower house of the Oireachtas, and may vote in both constituencies if entitled.

The Local Government (Dublin) Act 1930, passed by the Cumann na nGaedheal government, provided that Dublin City Council would comprise 30 popularly elected "ordinary members" and five "commercial members" elected by business ratepayers (individuals or corporate persons). The commercial members were elected by single transferable vote in a single five-member constituency, with each elector casting between one and six ballots depending on the rate they paid. The commercial members were abolished in 1935 by the Fianna Fáil government.

Inland fisheries boards prior to 2010 were elected by holders of fishing licences, who until 1980 had varying numbers of votes depending on the cost of their licences.

New Zealand 
Plural voting, also referred to as "dual voting", was abolished in New Zealand in 1889 for general elections. Hower, it is still permitted in some local elections, such as Auckland Council.  It was previously available to certain male property owners.

Contemporary theory
Philosopher Thomas Mulligan has proposed a system of plural voting which uses a mathematical algorithm to determine voters' ability and then gives higher-ability voters more votes.

Yulia Latynina proposes to offer money to voters who agree to sell their voting right.

Nevil Shute's In The Wet

Nevil Shute's 1953 novel In the Wet offers a system of up to seven votes for a person based on their achievements (although it would be technically very difficult for one individual to achieve all seven votes).

See also
University constituency
One man, one vote
Suffrage
Prussian three-class franchise
Cumulative voting

References 

Electoral systems